Arge humeralis, the poison ivy sawfly, is a species of argid sawfly in the family Argidae.
.Larvae feed on poison ivy, Toxicodendron radicans.

References

External links

 

Argidae
Articles created by Qbugbot